The Robert Emmett Ginna Nuclear Power Plant, commonly known as Ginna, is a nuclear power plant located on the southern shore of Lake Ontario, in the town of Ontario, Wayne County, New York, United States,  approximately  east of Rochester, New York.  It is a single unit Westinghouse 2-Loop pressurized water reactor, similar to those at Point Beach, Kewaunee, and Prairie Island. Having gone into commercial operation in 1970, Ginna became the second oldest nuclear power reactor, after Nine Mile unit 1, still in operation in the United States when the Oyster Creek power plant was permanently shut down on September 17, 2018.

History
The plant was named after Robert Emmett Ginna, a former chief executive of Rochester Gas & Electric, who was one of the nation's earliest advocates of using nuclear energy to generate electricity.

Ginna is owned and operated by Constellation Energy following separation from Exelon in 2022. Constellation, prior to merger with Exelon purchased it from Rochester Gas and Electric in 2004.

The Ginna plant was the site of a nuclear accident when, on January 25, 1982, a small amount of radioactive steam leaked into the air after a steam-generator tube ruptured. The leak which lasted 93 minutes led to the declaration of a site emergency. The rupture was caused by a small pie-pan-shaped object left in the steam generator during an outage. This was not the first time a tube rupture had occurred at an American reactor but following on so closely behind the Three Mile Island accident caused considerable attention to be focused on the incident at the Ginna plant.

In 1996 the original Westinghouse supplied steam generators (including the one that was damaged in 1982 and repaired) were replaced by two brand new Babcock & Wilcox steam generators.  This project enabled an uprating of Ginna's output several years later and was a major factor in the approval of the plant's operating license extension for 20 years beyond the original license (originally valid until 2009).

Electricity Production

Surrounding population

The 2010 U.S. population within  of Ginna was 66,847, an increase of 12.7 percent in a decade, according to an analysis of U.S. Census data for msnbc.com. The 2010 U.S. population within  was 1,269,589, an increase of 2.1 percent since 2000. Cities within 50 miles include Rochester (17 miles to city center). Canadian population is not included in these figures.

Seismic risk
The Nuclear Regulatory Commission's estimate of the risk each year of an earthquake intense enough to cause core damage to the reactor at Ginna was 1 in 76,923, according to an NRC study published in August 2010.

See also

 New York energy law

References

http://www.whec.com/whecimages/ginna_nuclear.jpg

External links 

R.E.Ginna Homepage

Energy infrastructure completed in 1970
Buildings and structures in Wayne County, New York
Nuclear power plants in New York (state)
Nuclear power stations using pressurized water reactors
Exelon